Anna Maria Spanou (born ) is a Greek volleyball player. She has played in AEK Athens, GS. Ilioupoli Athens, Greece Barcelona, Spain, the Bangkok Glass team, Quimper Volley 29 and from 2019 has played for GEN-I Volley, Nova Gorica, Slovenia.

Spanou also competes in beach volleyball.

References

Living people
1995 births
Greek women's volleyball players
21st-century Greek women
Sportspeople from Chalcis